The 2010 NHK Trophy was the first event of six in the 2010–11 ISU Grand Prix of Figure Skating, a senior-level international invitational competition series.
It was held at the Nippon Gaishi Ice Arena in Nagoya on October 22–24. Medals were awarded in the disciplines of men's singles, ladies' singles, pair skating, and ice dancing. Skaters earned points toward qualifying for the 2010–11 Grand Prix Final.

This was the first Grand Prix event with the new ice dancing format of a short dance/free dance rather than a compulsory dance/original dance/free dance.

Schedule
 Friday, Oct. 22
 Short dance
 Pairs' short program
 Ladies' short program
 Saturday, Oct. 23
 Men's short program
 Free dance
 Pairs' free skating
 Ladies' free skating
 Sunday, Oct. 24
 Men's free skating
 Exhibition gala

Results

Men

Ladies

Pairs

Ice dancing

External links

 
 
 
 
 
 ISU entries/results page
 Stating orders/detailed results
 Official website
 Photos of NHK Trophy 2010

Nhk Trophy, 2010
NHK Trophy